Players and pairs who neither have high enough rankings nor receive wild cards may participate in a qualifying tournament held one week before the annual Wimbledon Tennis Championships.

Seeds

  Petr Korda (second round)
  Michael Kohlmann (qualifying competition, lucky loser)
  Mosé Navarra (first round)
  Axel Pretzsch (second round)
  Geoff Grant (first round)
  Max Mirnyi (qualifying competition)
  Mikael Tillström (qualifier)
  Christian Vinck (qualifier)
  Radek Štěpánek (second round, withdrew)
  Sebastián Prieto (first round)
  Diego Nargiso (second round)
  Stéphane Huet (first round)
  Alejandro Hernández (qualifier)
  Tuomas Ketola (second round)
  Alex O'Brien (qualifying competition)
  Ivo Heuberger (first round)
  André Sá (qualifier)
  Maurice Ruah (second round)
  Mark Draper (qualifying competition)
  Neville Godwin (first round)
  Cristiano Caratti (qualifier)
  Wayne Arthurs (qualifier)
  Michael Tebbutt (first round)
  Brian MacPhie (first round)
  Bob Bryan (second round)
  Michael Hill (qualifying competition)
  Lorenzo Manta (qualifier)
  Stefano Pescosolido (second round)
  Rodolphe Gilbert (first round)
  Eyal Ran (first round)
  Gouichi Motomura (first round)
  Michael Joyce (qualifying competition)

Qualifiers

  Danny Sapsford
  Paradorn Srichaphan
  Nuno Marques
  Jamie Delgado
  Lorenzo Manta
  Arvind Parmar
  Mikael Tillström
  Christian Vinck
  Nenad Zimonjić
  Richey Reneberg
  Cristiano Caratti
  Wayne Arthurs
  Alejandro Hernández
  Grant Stafford
  André Sá
  Sandon Stolle

Lucky loser
  Michael Kohlmann

Qualifying draw

First qualifier

Second qualifier

Third qualifier

Fourth qualifier

Fifth qualifier

Sixth qualifier

Seventh qualifier

Eighth qualifier

Ninth qualifier

Tenth qualifier

Eleventh qualifier

Twelfth qualifier

Thirteenth qualifier

Fourteenth qualifier

Fifteenth qualifier

Sixteenth qualifier

External links

 1999 Wimbledon Championships – Men's draws and results at the International Tennis Federation

Men's Singles Qualifying
Wimbledon Championship by year – Men's singles qualifying